Dicynodontoidea is an infraorder of dicynodont therapsids that includes the famous dicynodont Dicynodon, Lystrosaurus and the Triassic Kannemeyeriiformes, as well as numerous other closely related species. The name was coined by American paleontologist Everett C. Olson in 1941 as an infraorder, despite using the typical "-oidea" suffix of superfamilies, and was later redefined under a phylogenetic context in 2009 by paleontologist Christian F. Kammerer.

References

Dicynodonts
Permian synapsids
Triassic synapsids
Lopingian first appearances
Late Triassic extinctions